The 1909–10 Luxembourg National Division was the 1st season of top level association football in Luxembourg.

Overview
It was performed by 9 teams, and Racing Club Luxembourg won the championship.

League standings

Final

|}

References
Luxembourg - List of final tables (RSSSF)

1909-10
1909–10 in European association football leagues
Nat